Adriatic League expanded from 14 to 16 teams before the 2004–05 season. It was the second time since the inaugural 2001-02 that the competition expanded its number of teams.

16 teams from Slovenia, Croatia, Bosnia and Herzegovina, Serbia and Montenegro participated in Goodyear League in its fourth season: Union Olimpija, Helios, Pivovarna Laško, Geoplin Slovan, Cibona VIP, Zadar, Zagreb, Split Croatia Osiguranje, Šibenka Dalmare, Široki Hercegtisak, Bosna ASA BH TELECOM, Crvena zvezda, Partizan Pivara MB, Hemofarm, Reflex, Budućnost.

In this season the league also decided to change the play-off system. The Final Tournament was expanded and renamed into the Final Eight Tournament. There were 30 rounds played in the regular part of the season, best eight teams qualified for the Final Eight Tournament which was played in Belgrade from April 28 until May 1, 2005.

Hemofarm became the 2005 Goodyear League Champion.

Throughout the season, the issue of Partizan's forward Milan Gurović not being allowed to enter Croatia due to having a tattoo of Draža Mihailović on his left shoulder received much attention in the media.

Regular season

Stats Leaders

Points

Rebounds

Assists

Ranking MVP

Final eight
Matches played at Pionir Hall, Belgrade

References

2004–05
2004–05 in European basketball leagues
2004–05 in Serbian basketball
2004–05 in Slovenian basketball
2004–05 in Croatian basketball
2004–05 in Bosnia and Herzegovina basketball